Guido Leonardo Milán (born July 3, 1987) is an Argentine professional footballer who plays as a centre-back for Gimnasia y Tiro.

External links
 
 
 

Living people
1987 births
Argentine footballers
Argentine expatriate footballers
Association football defenders
Primera Nacional players
Primera B Metropolitana players
Ligue 1 players
Ligue 2 players
Championnat National players
Liga MX players
Deportivo Español footballers
Gimnasia y Esgrima de Jujuy footballers
Club Atlético Atlanta footballers
FC Metz players
C.D. Veracruz footballers
Ferro Carril Oeste footballers
Argentine expatriate sportspeople in France
Argentine expatriate sportspeople in Mexico
Expatriate footballers in France
Expatriate footballers in Mexico